Danny Fuller (born February 15, 1982) is a Pipeline surfer ranked 527th in the world.

He was married to Tori Praver, a model and swimwear designer; they separated in June 2017. The couple have a daughter, Ryan and a son, Phoenix.

References

External links 
 

1982 births
Living people
American surfers
People from Kauai